In enzymology, a L-lysine 6-oxidase is an enzyme that catalyzes the chemical reaction

L-lysine + O2 + H2O  2-aminoadipate 6-semialdehyde + H2O2 + NH3

The 3 substrates of this enzyme are L-lysine, O2, and H2O, whereas its 3 products are 2-aminoadipate 6-semialdehyde, H2O2, and NH3.

This enzyme belongs to the family of oxidoreductases, specifically those acting on the CH-NH2 group of donors with oxygen as acceptor.  The systematic name of this enzyme class is L-lysine:oxygen 6-oxidoreductase (deaminating). Other names in common use include L-lysine-epsilon-oxidase, Lod, LodA, and marinocine.

References

 
 

EC 1.4.3
Enzymes of unknown structure